Blood Relatives (original French title: Les Liens de sang) is a 1978 Canadian-French mystery film directed by Claude Chabrol from a screenplay that he and Sydney Banks adapted from the 1975 novel of the same name by Ed McBain. Set in Montreal, Canada, it involves the brutal murder of a teenage girl and the subsequent investigation led by Donald Sutherland as Steve Carella, the lead character of McBain's 87th Precinct series. Blood Relatives was filmed under a policy that allowed full tax deferment to foreign produced films if they reflected a specific portrait of Canada. For this reason, the novel's setting of a thinly-veiled New York City is changed to Montreal. Filmmaker Akira Kurosawa (whose 1963 film High and Low was adapted from an Ed McBain novel) called Chabrol a "pretty skillful director" and this film "the best of all Ed McBain adaptations".

Synopsis
One rainy night a teenage girl called Patricia staggers wounded into a police station saying that she and her older cousin Muriel, who lived in her family home, had been brutally attacked with a knife in a dark alley. The police find the mutilated body of the attractive Muriel. Patricia describes the assailant to them, but in an identity parade picks out a policeman.

Led by Inspector Carella, the investigation tries to find out who might have wanted to kill an apparently normal girl from an apparently normal family. A possible clue comes at the funeral, when Patricia's brother Andrew in grief throws himself on the coffin of his dead cousin. Patricia then tells Carella that it was Andrew who had murdered Muriel, his motive being that she had been sleeping with him but left him for her married boss, and had tried to kill Patricia as the only witness. The proof, she says, was in Muriel's diary.

When found by the police, the diary confirms Patricia's second story, insofar as Muriel did switch her affections from Andrew to her boss, but it also records a violent encounter between an evasive Muriel and an angry Andrew which formed the basis of Patricia's first story. After repeated lying, the girl admits that she was lethally jealous of the sexier Muriel, who she felt had stolen the love of her brother. After killing her horribly, she wounded herself to give credibility to her story.

References

External links

1978 films
1970s mystery films
French mystery films
Canadian mystery films
Films directed by Claude Chabrol
Films set in Montreal
Films shot in Montreal
Films based on novels by Ed McBain
English-language Canadian films
English-language French films
1970s Canadian films
1970s French films